Toffo  is a town and commune in the Atlantique Department of southern Benin. The commune covers an area of 515 square kilometres and as of 2002 had a population of 74,717 people.

Important people
Bernardin Gantin, cardinal.

References
 

Communes of Benin
Populated places in the Atlantique Department
Arrondissements of Benin